The World Ocean Network (Réseau Océan Mondial) is an international non-profit association of organizations to promote the sustainable use of the oceans. One of its motto is "Caring for the Blue Planet, you can make a difference!"

It was established in November 2002.  Its office is in Nausicaä - The French National Sea Centre in Boulogne-sur-Mer, France

Activities
Co-sponsor with The Ocean Project of World Ocean Day on 8 June since 2003; World Oceans Day officially recognized by the United Nations in 2009.
Partner with Association of Science-Technology Centers's IGLO initiative to raise awareness of the effects of global warming (International Action on Global Warming) 
Sponsored three international meetings of aquariums, museums and science centers on the ocean in 1999, 2002, and 2006
Created the "Passport" of "Citizen of the Ocean" for individual commitment to marine conservation through daily actions.
Launched "Mr Goodfish" campaign, to teach restaurateurs and chefs how to cook fish sustainably.

References

External links

International environmental organizations
World Ocean
Environmental organizations based in France